Langfloget Cliff is a rock cliff  long at the west side of Flogeken Glacier, in the Mühlig-Hofmann Mountains of Queen Maud Land, Antarctica. It was mapped by Norwegian cartographers from surveys and air photos by the Sixth Norwegian Antarctic Expedition (1956–60) and named Langfloget (the long rock wall).

References

Cliffs of Queen Maud Land
Princess Martha Coast